The End of the Innocence may refer to:

The End of the Innocence (album), an album by Don Henley
"The End of the Innocence" (song), a song by Don Henley
"The End of the Innocence", an episode of Dharma & Greg
"The End of the Innocence", an episode of American Dreams

See also
End of Innocence (disambiguation)